EGM Green LLC. is an American private corporation, specializing in Design and Manufacture of eco-friendly casino gaming products.

Foundation
The company was founded in Toms River, New Jersey in March 2007. The Company was an offshoot of Executive Gaming Monthly, a seller of home casino products. EGM Green was founded by Eric Hansel, Green columnist for Casino Journal, out of a desire to bring sustainable, environmental, design elements to casinos.

About
EGM Green is the first company to develop and design casino tables, gaming seating and luxury lounge furniture that is completely green. It is a green consulting, design, and manufacturing firm intended to meet the needs of the hotel and casino market. EGM Green is a venture of Executive Gaming Monthly to bring 100% Eco-friendly gaming products to casino and luxury markets, and will allow operators using them to earn points toward LEED certification.  These products include poker tables, blackjack tables, roulette tables, mini-baccarat, baccarat and more that are all made out of Eco-friendly materials. Additionally, a variety of seating products are offered.

EGM Green also makes luxury lounge furniture for any eco-friendly environment. All materials they use are Forest Stewardship Council-certified, recycled or reclaimed. EGM Green has customized casinos, hotels, spas and other resort area with environmentally friendly furniture. The furniture can be designed and manufactured according to a property’s specifications. EGM can also assist in developing an individual plan for each environment, detailing a custom plan and providing a budget for the customer's needs. EGM Green works with Josh Dorfman, Sirius Radio’s “Lazy Environmentalist”, to help casinos live up to their corporate social responsibility initiatives.

References

External links
EGM, the sister company
EGM Green

Gambling companies of the United States
Environmental design
Companies based in Ocean County, New Jersey
American companies established in 2007
Privately held companies based in New Jersey
2007 establishments in New Jersey